Olton is a city in Lamb County, Texas, United States. The population was 2,215 at the 2010 census.

Geography

Olton is located at  (34.1834142 –102.1346258). Olton was founded in 1906.

In 2023, the southern portion of the city is majority Hispanic and Latino while the northern portion is mainly non-Hispanic Anglo White. The northern side has more wealth.

Demographics

2020 census

As of the 2020 United States census, there were 1,989 people, 614 households, and 435 families residing in the city.

2000 census
As of the census of 2000,  2,288 people, 742 households, and 571 families resided in the city. The population density was 1,683.8 people per square mile (649.6/km). The 852 housing units averaged 627.0 per square mile (241.9/km). The racial makeup of the city was 66.56% White, 2.01% African American, 1.31% Native American, 0.09% Asian, 27.49% from other races, and 2.53% from two or more races. Hispanics or Latinos of any race were 64.51% of the population.

Of the 742 households, 42.3% had children under the age of 18 living with them, 59.6% were married couples living together, 11.7% had a female householder with no husband present, and 23.% were not families. About 20.9% of all households were made up of individuals, and 11.3% had someone living alone who was 65 years of age or older. The average household size was 2.99 and the average family size was 3.47.

In the city, the population was distributed as 33.9% under the age of 18, 7.6% from 18 to 24, 23.3% from 25 to 44, 18.7% from 45 to 64, and 16.6% who were 65 years of age or older. The median age was 32 years. For every 100 females, there were 97.1 males. For every 100 females age 18 and over, there were 84.2 males.

The median income for a household in the city was $24,010, and for a family was $25,926. Men had a median income of $22,358 versus $18,833 for women. The per capita income for the city was $10,189. About 21.4% of families and 24.9% of the population were below the poverty line, including 28.6% of those under age 18 and 21.8% of those age 65 or over.

Education
The City of Olton is served by the Olton Independent School District.

Media
The local weekly newspaper was the Olton Enterprise. The Olton Enterprise stopped publication in 2021.

 there is one newspaper, Lamb County Leader-News, in all of Lamb County.

Notable people

 Jimmy Dean, American country music singer, actor, television host, and businessman
 Peggy Sue Gerron, inspiration for the Buddy Holly song "Peggy Sue"
 Dawn DeBerry Stump, businesswoman and government official

Climate
According to the Köppen climate classification, Olton has a semiarid climate, BSk on climate maps.

See also
Spade Ranch (Texas)
Llano Estacado
Blackwater Draw
Yellow House Draw

References

External links

Olton Chamber of Commerce

Cities in Texas
Cities in Lamb County, Texas